The seventeenth season of Family Guy aired on Fox in the United States from September 30, 2018, to May 12, 2019.

The series follows the dysfunctional Griffin family, consisting of father Peter, mother Lois, daughter Meg, son Chris, baby Stewie, and the family dog Brian, who reside in their hometown of Quahog. The season's executive producers are Seth MacFarlane, Alec Sulkin, Richard Appel, Steve Callaghan, Danny Smith, Kara Vallow, Mark Hentemann, Tom Devanney, Patrick Meighan and Cherry Chevapravatdumrong. The season's showrunners are Sulkin and Appel.

This season sees Brian trapped in a marriage with a dying woman (played by Casey Wilson) in a two-part arc ("Married... with Cancer", "Dead Dog Walking"), another two-part arc focused on Peter becoming a scaremongering news anchor, which lands him a job as President Trump's press secretary ("Hefty Shades of Gray", "Trump Guy"), Quagmire once again bonding with an estranged child who's biologically his ("No Giggity, No Doubt"), Meg qualifying for the Winter Olympics in Korea ("The Griffin Winter Games"), Brian and Stewie shrinking to microscopic size ("Big Trouble in Little Quahog"), Peter and Brian competing to become the next Pawtucket Brewery mascot (“Pawtucket Pete”), Meg becoming an Internet influencer ("Girl, Internetted"), Peter identifying as transgender ("Trans-Fat"), a meta episode where the Griffins record DVD commentary ("You Can't Handle the Booth!"), and Quagmire running against Brian for mayor ("Adam West High").


Episodes

Home media
This was the final Family Guy DVD to be released by Walt Disney Studios Home Entertainment.

References

2018 American television seasons
2019 American television seasons
Family Guy seasons
Family Guy (season 17) episodes